The Coat of arms of the Grand Duchy of Saxe-Weimar-Eisenach was created in 1815 when the area was raised to the title of Grand Duchy, and ended in 1918 with the transition of Saxe-Weimar-Eisenach into the new state of Thuringia. The full grand ducal style was Grand Duke of Saxe-Weimar-Eisenach, Landgrave in Thuringia, Margrave of Meissen, Princely Count of Henneberg, Lord of Blankenhayn, Neustadt and Tautenburg, and this is represented in the arms:
 In the first quarter, the striped lion of Thuringia;
 In the second quarter, the arms of the Margraviate of Meissen;
 In the third quarter, per pale the arms of the County of Henneberg and of Neustadt-;
 In the fourth quarter, per pale the arms of the Lord of Blankenhayn (Blankenhain) and Tautenburg;
 Above all the arms of Saxony, as was tradition for the descendants of the Saxon line.

It was used on the Grand Ducal Standard c.1862 - c.1878.

References

 Saxe-Weimar-Eisenach on International Heraldry, accessed 2009-04-12.

Saxe-Weimar-Eisenach
Saxe-Weimar
Saxe-Weimar-Eisenach
Saxe-Weimar-Eisenach